Sargeist is a Finnish black metal band formed in 1999. Originally created as a solo project by Shatraug of the Finnish black metal act Horna, he was joined by other members since 2000, who subsequently left the band. After the demo recording Tyranny Returns (2001), the line-up was augmented by Hoath Torog and Horns, both from the Finnish black metal outfit Behexen, and this line-up remained stable until 2016.

Both musically and lyrically, Sargeist stays close to the roots of Scandinavian "old school" black metal. Lyrical subjects thus often deal with Satanism and anti-Christian blasphemy, as well as darkness, depression, misanthropy and hate. The band's name combines the two German words, "sarg" (coffin) and "geist" (spirit, ghost), and derives from the song "The Old Coffin Spirit" by the black metal band Rotting Christ. All members go by pseudonyms.

Members
Current members
 Shatraug (Ville Pystynen) – guitar (1999–present), bass (1999-2008)
 VJS  - guitar (2014–present)
 Abysmal (Marko Hirvonen) - bass (2016–present)
 Gruft (Roni Sahari) - drums (2016–present)
 Profundus (Markus Tuonenjoki) - vocals (2016–present)

Former members
 Hoath Torog (Marko Saarikalle) – vocals (2002-2016)
 Horns (Jani Rekola) – drums (2002-2016)
 Vainaja (Perttu Pakkanen) - bass (2009-2016)
 Lord Volos – drums (2000)
 Gorsedd Marter – guitar (2001)
 Makha Karn – drums (2001)

Discography

2005: Funeral Curses (compilation album)
2013: The Rebirth of a Cursed Existence (compilation album)
2020: Black Devotion Will Let the Devil In (Boxed set)

References

External links
 Sargeist Official Website (currently unavailable)
 Sargeist Bandpage on Moribund Records
 Sargeist on Discogs
 Interview (2003) with Shatraug by Brett VanPut on Transcending the Mundane
 Review of  Disciple of the Heinous Path (2005) by J. Bennet on Decibel Magazine

Finnish black metal musical groups
Musical groups established in 1999
Finnish musical trios
1999 establishments in Finland